Ephraim Kalsakau (or Éphraïm Kalsakau) is a ni-Vanuatu trade unionist and politician.

In 1987, he spearheaded the founding of the Vanuatu Labour Party (VLP), to be the political arm of united trade unions. He has rejected the idea that "there is a major difference between the Vanuaaku Pati and the UMP", the country's two major parties.

In 2004, he stood unsuccessfully for Parliament as a VLP candidate in Port Vila. In the 2008 general election, he was elected to Parliament, representing the VLP.

He is currently the secretary general of the Vanuatu National Workers Union.

External links
 "Le mouvement travailliste et politique", Ephraim Kalsakau, in Howard Van Trease & Michelle Craw (eds.), La politique Mélanésienne, Macmillan Brown Centre for Pacific Studies, University of the South Pacific (Institute of Pacific Studies), 1995, pp. 431–6
 "Re: Comparisons by Chamber of Commerce and Industry and USP", a letter to the editor of the Vanuatu Daily Post by Ephraim Kalsakau, on the distortion of statistics relating to the rights and conditions of workers (13 December 2008)

References

Living people
Members of the Parliament of Vanuatu
Vanuatuan trade unionists
Trade union leaders
Vanuatu Labour Party politicians
Year of birth missing (living people)